Strandiola paradoxa is a species of beetles in the family Buprestidae, the only species in the genus Strandiola.

References

Buprestidae genera